Pens are common writing instruments. 

Pens or PENS may also refer to:
 Pen (enclosure), enclosure for holding animals
 Pen, an adult female swan
 Gladius (cephalopod), or pen, a hard internal bodypart found in certain cephalopods
 Pittsburgh Penguins or the Pens, an American ice hockey team
 PENS (software)
 Pan-European Network Service, a telecommunications network
 Politeknik Elektronika Negeri Surabaya, a technical institution in Indonesia

Other uses

 Pen (disambiguation)
 PEN (disambiguation)
 Penalty shootout